The Mad Love Life of a Hot Vampire is a 1971 American pornographic horror film directed by Ray Dennis Steckler. It stars Jim Parker as Count Dracula, portrayed here as a Las Vegas pimp, along with Carolyn Brandt and Rock Heinrich.

Cast
 Jim Parker as Count Dracula
 Carolyn Brandt as Elaina, wife of Dracula (as Jane Bond)
 Rock Heinrich as Hunchback

Home media
In October 2014, The Mad Love Life of a Hot Vampire was released on DVD by Vinegar Syndrome as a triple feature with the 1973 film Peeping Tom and the 1976 film Red Heat, both of which were also directed by Steckler.

References

Further reading

External links
 
 

1970s exploitation films
1970s pornographic films
1971 horror films
1971 films
American exploitation films
American pornographic films
American sexploitation films
American vampire films
Films set in the Las Vegas Valley
1970s English-language films
1970s American films